Ernest Ziaja (11 April 1919 – 29 August 1997) was a Polish ice hockey player. He played for HKS Siemianowiczanki during his career. He also played for the Polish national team at the 1948 Winter Olympics.

References

External links

1919 births
1997 deaths
Ice hockey players at the 1948 Winter Olympics
Olympic ice hockey players of Poland
People from Siemianowice Śląskie
Polish ice hockey forwards
Sportspeople from Silesian Voivodeship